Cristian Esteban Gamboa Luna (born 24 October 1989), commonly known as Cristian Gamboa, is a Costa Rican professional footballer who plays as a right-back for Bundesliga club VfL Bochum and the Costa Rica national team.

Gamboa is an international player for Costa Rica and played in the team at the 2014 FIFA World Cup that reached the quarter-finals.

Club career
Gamboa was born in Liberia, Costa Rica. At age 15, he was deemed not good enough to play for Costa Rican clubs Saprissa and Alajuelense.
He played from the 2006–2007 season for hometown club Municipal Liberia. He then moved abroad and joined Norwegian side Fredrikstad in summer 2010 and played there for two half seasons, before he joined Copenhagen in summer 2011. He made his debut in a 0–1 loss against Standard Liège in the UEFA Europa League.

Gamboa joined Rosenborg on a three-month-loan deal in August 2012 with the Norwegian club having an option to buy. He made his debut on 3 September 2012 in a Tippeligaen match away at Stabæk, winning 2–0. By November he had impressed sufficiently in the ten games he played in for Rosenborg for them to offer him a permanent deal, and he signed five-year contract with the club.

In late July 2014, English Premier League club West Bromwich Albion agreed to sign Gamboa for a fee estimated in the media as around £2 million. Because the player had insufficient recent international appearances for a work permit to be granted automatically, completion of the deal was dependent on a successful appeal to the Football Association, which was confirmed on 5 August. The player signed a three-year contract.

He made his debut on 26 August 2014, coming on as a second-half substitute in a League cup tie against Oxford United. He made his League debut a few days later against Swansea City, after which further substitute appearances followed. Gamboa finally made a starting appearance on 4 October in a 2–1 loss away at Liverpool in the league. Despite the defeat, he was reported as having turned in an impressive performance. It was however to be Gamboa's only league start that season, and he fell further out of favour when manager Alan Irvine was sacked in December and replaced by Tony Pulis. From January 2015 onwards to the end of the season, Gamboa only played one minute of first team football, coming on as an injury-time substitute in a fifth round FA Cup tie against West Ham in February 2015.

Gamboa continued to struggle to hold down a first team place in his second season in England, playing only two games early on in the season. He then went five months without a first team appearance, before making a return to the side in February 2016 in an FA Cup fourth round replay tie against Peterborough United.

On 30 August 2016, Gamboa signed for Scottish Premiership club Celtic on a three-year deal.

On 27 August 2019, Gamboa joined VfL Bochum on a two-year deal.

International career
He participated in the 2009 FIFA U-20 World Cup for Costa Rica where they finished in fourth place. He has represented Costa Rica in other international games.

He made his debut for the Costa Rica national football team in January 2010, in a friendly match against Argentina. Gamboa scored his first goal in a 7–0 home win against Guyana in a 2014 World Cup qualifier.  He was selected for the Costa Rica national team against part at the 2014 FIFA World Cup, and played in all five games, reaching the quarter final where they were eventually knocked out on penalty kicks by the Netherlands.

In May 2018 he was selected in Costa Rica's 23-man squad for the 2018 FIFA World Cup in Russia.

Personal life
Gamboa is married to Melissa Salazar and they have two children, Felipe and Julián.

Career statistics

Club

International

Scores and results list Costa Rica's goal tally first, score column indicates score after each Gamboa goal.

Honours
Municipal Liberia
Costa Rican Primera División: Clausura 2009

Copenhagen
Danish Cup: 2011–12

Celtic
Scottish Premiership: 2016–17, 2017–18
Scottish League Cup: 2016–17, 2018–19
Scottish Cup: 2016–17

VfL Bochum
2. Bundesliga: 2020–21

Costa Rica
CONCACAF Gold Cup: Bronze-medal 2017
Copa Centroamericana: Runner-up 2011
FIFA U-20 World Cup: Fourth-place 2009
CONCACAF U-20 Championship: 2009

Individual
CONCACAF Best XI: 2017

References

External links
 
 2014 World Cup profile - FIFA
 F.C. Copenhagen statistics
 Profile at Football-Lineups.com

1989 births
Living people
People from Guanacaste Province
Costa Rican footballers
Association football fullbacks
Costa Rica international footballers
Copa América Centenario players
2011 Copa Centroamericana players
2014 FIFA World Cup players
2015 CONCACAF Gold Cup players
2017 CONCACAF Gold Cup players
2018 FIFA World Cup players
2019 CONCACAF Gold Cup players
2009 CONCACAF U-20 Championship players
Municipal Liberia footballers
Fredrikstad FK players
F.C. Copenhagen players
Rosenborg BK players
West Bromwich Albion F.C. players
Celtic F.C. players
VfL Bochum players
Liga FPD players
Norwegian First Division players
Eliteserien players
Premier League players
Scottish Professional Football League players
Bundesliga players
2. Bundesliga players
Costa Rican expatriate footballers
Expatriate footballers in Norway
Expatriate men's footballers in Denmark
Expatriate footballers in England
Costa Rican expatriate sportspeople in Norway
Expatriate footballers in Scotland
Costa Rican expatriate sportspeople in England
Expatriate footballers in Germany